"Heavy Cross" is a song by American band Gossip. It was released on April 28, 2009, as the first single from the band's fourth album Music for Men. The song was the first international hit for Gossip, reaching the top ten across Europe, with a massive commercial success in Germany. When writing it, the band was influenced by Donna Summer and Siouxsie and the Banshees. The band recorded a studio version of the song in early 2009, but they had already been playing it live for two years.

Background and writing
Singer Beth Ditto explained to the NME that the song is: "about recreation and my friends, who I feel like are the ultimate creative re-creators." Composer and guitarist Nathan Howdeshell explained: "Heavy Cross' was an attempt to make my guitar sound like an Italo synth line. I had been listening to Charlie's 'Spacer Woman' and still can't get over the arpeggiated synth, so I detuned my strings to be the same notes and muted it and then came that song. Beth [Ditto] busted some Donna Summer elements, and since I have been listening to lots of darkwave, I put a bass synth on the track as opposed to a real bass: we wanted something steeped in '80s darkwave. I can't stop listening to 'Red Light' by Siouxsie and the Banshees. Hannah [Blilie] decided to stay on the drum rims for the majority of the track, making it more of a Creatures-type track (another Siouxsie Sioux reference)." "Heavy Cross" was recorded in a studio in early 2009, although the band had already been playing the song live for two years. They had started their 2007 Glastonsbury concert at the John Peel stage, performing an early version of it which was broadcast on BBC television.

Commercial performance
The single was a commercial success. It reached the top 10 in Australia and on the US Billboard Hot Dance Club Songs chart from mid- to late 2009. It  peaked just outside the top 10 in New Zealand, and made the top 40 in Ireland and the UK; Gossip had already achieved two top 40 singles in the latter region, with "Standing in the Way of Control" and "Listen Up!" in 2006.

The single was especially successful in Germany, where it was certified triple gold for selling over 450,000 copies and is, the "most successful internationally produced single of all time". As of April 2011, the single had spent 97 weeks on the German Singles Chart without ever reaching No. 1, staying for 27 weeks in that chart's top 10. In 2011, it was included in a J'Adore advert from Dior, making it rise to fame again.

Track listings
UK CD
 "Heavy Cross"
 "Heavy Cross" (Fred Falke Remix)

Australia CD
 "Heavy Cross" (radio edit)
 "Heavy Cross"
 "Heavy Cross" (Fred Falke Remix)
 "Heavy Cross" (Burns Remix)

Personnel
 Beth Ditto – vocals
 Brace Paine – guitar, keyboards, bass guitar
 Hannah Blilie – drums

Charts

NRJ Session

Year-end charts

Decade-end charts

Certifications

References

2009 singles
Song recordings produced by Rick Rubin
Gossip (band) songs
Songs written by Brace Paine
Songs written by Hannah Blilie
Songs written by Beth Ditto
2009 songs
Columbia Records singles